Corneille Stroobant (1811–1890) was a Belgian priest-scholar with a particular interest in local history and genealogy.

Life
Stroobant was born in Turnhout on 6 November 1811, and studied at a secondary school there. He enrolled in the Major Seminary of the Archdiocese of Mechelen on 2 September 1833, and on 2 May 1836 was appointed to teach in the minor seminary in Hoogstraten. From 1845 to 1879 he was a missionary in England. In retirement he lived in Brussels and dedicated his time to further research, publishing numerous articles in the Annales de l'Académie Royale d'Archéologie de Belgique. He died suddenly in Brussels on 20 October 1890 and was buried in his family's vault in Wemmel.

Works
 Notice historique et généalogique sur les seigneurs d'Oisquercq et de Val (1848)
 Notice sur la fondation de la première messe dans l'église paroissiale de Hal-Notre-Dame (1849)
 Notice historique et généalogique sur les seigneurs de Braine-le-Château et Haut-Ittre (1849)
 Notice historique et généalogique sur les seigneurs de Tyberchamps (1851)
 Notices sur les quatre anciennes vicomtés de Hollande (1853)
 Histoire de la commune de Virginal (1853)
 Histoire de la commune de Feluy (1858)

References

1811 births
1890 deaths
19th-century Belgian Roman Catholic priests
19th-century Belgian historians
19th-century Belgian male writers
Belgian genealogists